Motor City Pride is an annual LGBT pride street festival, held in Hart Plaza in Detroit, Michigan the second Saturday and Sunday of June. Previously held in Ferndale, Michigan, the festival moved to Detroit in 2011.  It is the largest LGBT event held in Michigan.

Craig Covey, then director of Michigan Organization for Human Rights, is credited with organizing Detroit's first Gay and Lesbian pride march in 1985. The Detroit Area Gay & Lesbian Council organized PrideFest from 1982 to 1992. In 1993, PrideFest became its own organization known as South East Michigan Pride and held at the Oakland Community College in Royal Oak, MI with Michael Lary as the event director. In 2001, PrideFest was moved to downtown Ferndale under the new direction of the Triangle Foundation. In 2003, the name changed to MotorCity Pride. In 2011, Motor City Pride was moved to downtown Detroit. 

No event is planned in 2020 as the COVID-19 pandemic was to blame; the 49th was deferred to June 2021.

Notable Performers 

Dave Audé
Andy Bell
Blu Cantrell
The Fundamentals
Killer Flamingos
God-Des and She
Ana Matronic
Alex Newell
Barbara Payton

See also 

 Hotter than July (Detroit)
 LGBT community of Metro Detroit

References

External links
 

1972 establishments in Michigan
Festivals in Detroit
LGBT culture in Detroit
Pride parades in Michigan
Recurring events established in 1972